Semioscopis mcdunnoughi is a species of moth of the family Depressariidae. It was described by John Frederick Gates Clarke in 1941. It is found in western North America, including Washington and British Columbia.

References

Moths described in 1941
Semioscopis